Warrick Scheffer (born 4 March 1992) is a South African former professional darts player who plays in Professional Darts Corporation (PDC) events.

Career 
Scheffer won the 2015 South African Masters to qualify for the 2016 PDC World Darts Championship. He was beaten 2–0 by John Michael in the preliminary round. He played in 2016 Q School, but only won one match over the four days. Scheffer again entered Q School in 2017 and on the final was two wins away from earning a tour card, but he lost 5–2 to Martin Schindler.

References

External links 

1992 births
Living people
South African darts players
Professional Darts Corporation associate players